Sebastian Angus Gardner (born 19 March 1960) is a British philosopher and Professor of Philosophy in the University College London. He is known for his expertise on Kant, German Idealism, and Freud.

Education and career

Gardner earned his B.A. in 1982 and his Ph.D. in 1987, both from Cambridge University.  He taught first at Birkbeck College, London and, since 1998, at UCL.  He has written extensively on Freud and psychoanalysis, on Kant, and on post-Kantian philosophy, including Fichte, Schelling, and Nietzsche.

Books
 Irrationality and the Philosophy of Psychoanalysis, Cambridge University Press, 1993
  Kant and the Critique of Pure Reason, Routledge, 1999
  Sartre's Being and Nothingness, Continuum, 2009

Edited
 Art and Morality, edited with Jose Luis Bermudez, Routledge, 2003
 The Transcendental Turn, edited with Matthew Grist, Oxford University Press, 2015

References

External links
Sebastian Gardner at UCL

21st-century British philosophers
Philosophy academics
Living people
1960 births
Academics of University College London
Alumni of the University of Cambridge
Kant scholars
Nietzsche scholars
Sartre scholars
Philosophers of art